Preston Erwin Blair (October 24, 1908 – April 19, 1995) was an American character animator, best remembered for his work at Walt Disney Productions and the Metro-Goldwyn-Mayer cartoon studio.

A native of Redlands, California, Blair began his animation career in the early 1930s at the Romer Gray Studio due to the studio not keeping up with his salary, he moved to Walter Lantz Productions. He later moved over to Charles Mintz's Screen Gems studio, and in the late 1930s moved over to the Disney studio. At Disney, Blair animated cartoon short subjects, Mickey Mouse scenes in "The Sorcerer's Apprentice" section of Fantasia (1940), and the hippo-alligator dance in Fantasia's "Dance of the Hours" sequence. He also did some work on Walt Disney's Pinocchio (1940) and Bambi (1942).

Blair left Disney after the 1941 Disney animator's strike, and was hired to work for Tex Avery's unit at MGM. There, he became particularly known for animating the titular female character in Red Hot Riding Hood. "Red" later re-appeared in more Avery cartoons, including Swing Shift Cinderella, Little Rural Riding Hood, Uncle Tom's Cabana and the Droopy cartoons The Shooting of Dan McGoo and Wild and Woolfy, with animation by Blair. In the late 1940s, Blair teamed with Avery animator Michael Lah to direct several Barney Bear cartoons.

Blair continued his career in animation into the 1960s, working on The Flintstones at Hanna-Barbera. He is better known, however, as an author of animation instructional books for Walter Foster Publishing. His first book, Animation, was published in 1948 and originally included images of the MGM & Disney cartoon characters he had animated, who were redrawn to obscure their origins in the second edition of the book. Blair would write many more animation how-to texts over the next forty years, culminating with Cartoon Animation (1994), a 224-page book which compiles most of the content from his previous books. A new edition of "Cartoon Animation" was published in November 2020 by Walter Foster Publishing, an imprint of The Quarto Group.

Preston Blair was the brother of artist Lee Everett Blair and the brother-in-law of artist and designer Mary Blair. He died on April 19, 1995.

References

External links
 
 

1908 births
1995 deaths
Animators from California
American animated film directors
Chouinard Art Institute alumni
People from Redlands, California
Walt Disney Animation Studios people
Hanna-Barbera people
Metro-Goldwyn-Mayer cartoon studio people